The men's 200 metres event at the 1999 All-Africa Games was held 17–18 September 1999 at the Johannesburg Stadium.

Medalists

Results

Heats
Qualification: First 3 of each heat (Q) and the next 4 fastest (q) qualified for the semifinals.

Semifinals
Qualification: First 4 of each semifinal (Q) qualified for the final.

Final
Wind: +0.6 m/s

References

200